Brunson is a town in Hampton County, South Carolina, United States. The population was 554 at the 2010 census.

Geography
Brunson is located in northern Hampton County at  (32.926738, -81.187651). U.S. Route 278 (Railroad Avenue) passes through the center of town, leading northwest  to Fairfax and southeast  to Hampton, the county seat.

Demographics

As of the census of 2000, there were 589 people, 237 households, and 162 families residing in the town. The population density was 581.3 people per square mile (225.2/km2). There were 287 housing units at an average density of 283.3 per square mile (109.7/km2). The racial makeup of the town was 55.35% White, 42.44% African American, 1.36% from other races, and 0.85% from two or more races. Hispanic or Latino of any race were 1.53% of the population.

There were 237 households, out of which 30.8% had children under the age of 18 living with them, 46.8% were married couples living together, 17.3% had a female householder with no husband present, and 31.6% were non-families. 28.3% of all households were made up of individuals, and 13.9% had someone living alone who was 65 years of age or older. The average household size was 2.49 and the average family size was 3.06.

In the town, the population was spread out, with 25.5% under the age of 18, 10.5% from 18 to 24, 26.0% from 25 to 44, 22.2% from 45 to 64, and 15.8% who were 65 years of age or older. The median age was 37 years. For every 100 females, there were 92.5 males. For every 100 females age 18 and over, there were 83.7 males.

The median income for a household in the town was $30,556, and the median income for a family was $32,778. Males had a median income of $30,833 versus $21,042 for females. The per capita income for the town was $14,431. About 13.7% of families and 16.0% of the population were below the poverty line, including 21.7% of those under age 18 and 10.1% of those age 65 or over.

Landmarks
The Brunson town hall is cited in Ripley's Believe It or Not! as the only octagonal town hall in the world built on stilts.

Oak Grove was listed on the National Register of Historic Places in 1976.

References

External links
Town of Brunson official website

Towns in Hampton County, South Carolina
Towns in South Carolina